Whiting Memorial Community House, also known as Whiting Community Center, is a historic community center located at Whiting, Lake County, Indiana. It was built in 1923, and is a two-story, steel frame building faced in rough red brick and in an eclectic style.  It has a hipped red tile roof, scattered gables and arches, and concrete bracket and medallion detailing. The building houses an auditorium, meeting rooms, an indoor track, gyms, lockers, a bowling alley, and swimming pool.  It was built by the Standard Oil Company for the city of Whiting.

It was listed in the National Register of Historic Places in 1980.

References

External links

Event venues on the National Register of Historic Places in Indiana
Buildings and structures completed in 1923
Buildings and structures in Lake County, Indiana
National Register of Historic Places in Lake County, Indiana
Whiting, Indiana